Milovan Raković (Serbian Cyrillic: Милован Раковић; born 19 February 1985) is a Serbian former professional basketball player. He is a 2.08 m tall center.

Professional career 
Raković played in youth categories of KK Partizan. He made his senior debut with Polet Keramika in the 2003–04 season. From 2004 to 2006 he played with Atlas and for the 2006–07 season he moved to Mega Ishrana.

In 2007, he joined the Russian Super League club Spartak Saint Petersburg and stayed with them for three seasons. On 6 July 2010, he signed a three-year deal with the Italian club Montepaschi Siena. In July 2011, he was loaned to Žalgiris Kaunas in Lithuania for the 2011–12 season. In the summer of 2012, he parted ways with Siena.

On 10 July 2012, Raković signed two-year contract with the Spanish team Bilbao Basket. After being released from Bilbao Basket, he signed a one-year deal with Triumph Lyubertsy on 25 July 2013. On 18 July 2014, he signed a two-year deal with Türk Telekom. After one season, he left the Turkish club. On 20 January 2016, he signed with the Spanish club Joventut Badalona for the rest of the 2015–16 ACB season.

On 7 December 2017, he signed with Union Neuchâtel Basket of the Swiss Basketball League.

NBA draft rights 
Raković was the last player picked in the 2007 NBA Draft; he was selected by the Dallas Mavericks and then traded along with cash to the Orlando Magic. On 14 July 2014, Raković's rights were traded from the Orlando Magic to the Chicago Bulls.  On 8 February 2018, Raković's draft rights were traded from the Chicago Bulls to the Portland Trail Blazers in exchange for Noah Vonleh and cash considerations.

Career statistics

EuroLeague 

|-
| style="text-align:left;"| 2010–11
| style="text-align:left;"| Montepaschi
| 22 || 22 || 17.4 || .547 || .000 || .560 || 3.8 || .4 || .7 || .2 || 8.0 || 6.3
|-
| style="text-align:left;"| 2011–12
| style="text-align:left;"| Žalgiris
| 16 || 2 || 15.5 || .522 || .000 || .567 || 2.6 || .4 || .6 || .3 || 7.1 || 4.6
|- class="sortbottom"
| style="text-align:left;"| Career
| style="text-align:left;"|
| 38 || 24 || 16.6 || .538 || .000 || .564 || 3.3 || .4 || .6 || .2 || 7.6 || 5.6

National team career 
As a member of the FR Yugoslavia under-16 national team, he won a gold medal at the 2001 FIBA Europe Under-16 Championship.

See also 
 List of NBA drafted players from Serbia
 Denver Nuggets draft history

References

External links 
 NBA.com profile
 Euroleague.net profile
 FIBA Europe profile
 FIBA.com profile

1985 births
Living people
Basketball League of Serbia players
BC Spartak Saint Petersburg players
BC Zenit Saint Petersburg players
BC Žalgiris players
Bilbao Basket players
Centers (basketball)
Dallas Mavericks draft picks
Joventut Badalona players
KK Beopetrol/Atlas Beograd players
KK Mega Basket players
Lega Basket Serie A players
Liga ACB players
Mens Sana Basket players
Sportspeople from Užice
Serbian men's basketball players
Serbian expatriate basketball people in Italy
Serbian expatriate basketball people in Lithuania
Serbian expatriate basketball people in Russia
Serbian expatriate basketball people in Spain
Serbian expatriate basketball people in Turkey
Serbian expatriate basketball people in Switzerland
Türk Telekom B.K. players
Union Neuchâtel Basket players